The San Antonio Iguanas were a minor league professional ice hockey team based in San Antonio, Texas.  The first expansion team in the Central Hockey League, they were active for seven seasons from 1994–1997 and 1998–2002.  Their home arena was the Freeman Coliseum. Bill Goldsworthy initially coached the team but stepped down for health reasons after only ten games. John Torchetti took over coaching duties, leading the Iguanas to the CHL finals in both of their first two years.

The team ceased operations after failing to find local investors following the introduction of the San Antonio Rampage—which resulted from a joint partnership between the Spurs and the Florida Panthers.

Season results

(Jim Goodman was the general manager)

References

External links
 Iguanas call it quits in San Antonio

Defunct Central Hockey League teams
Defunct ice hockey teams in Texas
Ice hockey clubs established in 1994
Sports clubs disestablished in 2002
1994 establishments in Texas
Ice hockey teams in Texas
2002 disestablishments in Texas
Sports teams in San Antonio